Lično is a municipality and village in Rychnov nad Kněžnou District in the Hradec Králové Region of the Czech Republic. It has about 600 inhabitants.

Administrative parts
Villages of Ostašovice and Radostovice are administrative parts of Lično.

References

External links

Villages in Rychnov nad Kněžnou District